Marie Doležalová (born 24 January 1987) is a Czech actress. Doležalová took part in the Czech television series StarDance in 2015, finishing first with dancing partner Marek Zelinka ahead of runners-up Jitka Schneiderová and Marek Dědík.

Filmography 
 Comeback (TV series) ... Saša Bůčková
 Dolls (2007) ... Iška
 Lojzička je číslo (2006) ... Lojzička
 Dobrá čtvrť (2005) (TV series) ... student Šárka

Theatre

Solidarita Theatre 
 The Jungle Book ... Snake Ka
 Bílá vrána .... Statue Daphne

Conservatory Theatre 
 Tři v tom .... Colombina
 Yvonne, Princess of Burgundy .... Lady of the Court/Aunt
 Liliomfi .... Camilla, governess

Strašnické divadlo 
 Bílá vrána .... Daphne
 The Jungle Book .... Snake Ka
 Popcorn .... Velvet Delamitri
 Tři v tom .... Colombina

Other stage works 
 Krysy .... ??? (Divadlo Na Prádle)
 August: Osage Country .... Jean Fordham (Stavovské divadlo)

References

External links 
 
 Personal web site

1987 births
Living people
People from Karviná
Czech film actresses
Czech stage actresses
Czech television actresses
Czech bloggers
21st-century Czech actresses
Czech women bloggers